Wattanakorn Sawatlakhorn (born 23 May  1998) is a Thai professional footballer who plays as a left back for Thai League 1 club BG Pathum United.

Career statistics

Club

References

External links

 Wattanakorn Sawatlakhorn at livesoccer888.com
 Wattanakorn Sawatlakhorn at EnglishUDFC.com

1997 births
Living people
Wattanakorn Sawatlakhorn
Wattanakorn Sawatlakhorn
Association football defenders
Wattanakorn Sawatlakhorn
Wattanakorn Sawatlakhorn
Wattanakorn Sawatlakhorn
Wattanakorn Sawatlakhorn